Antanas Tumėnas (13 May 1880 in Kurkliečiai, near Rokiškis – 8 February 1946 in Bachmanning, Austria) was a Lithuanian politician, teacher, professor of law, judge, Prime Minister of Lithuania in the 10th cabinet, Chairman of the Supreme Committee for the Liberation of Lithuania. He was a member of the Lithuanian Christian Democratic Party.

Tumėnas was elected to the Constituent Assembly of Lithuania and was appointed as chairman of the Constitutional Commission of Lithuania (1922).

Later he was a member of the 1st Seimas. He was the speaker of Seimas in 1923. He participated in creating the law system of the new republic. He was Minister of Justice in the 9th, 10th and 11th Cabinets of Lithuania.

References

External links 

 Bio at Lithuanian Seimas website

1880 births
1946 deaths
People from Rokiškis District Municipality
People from Kovno Governorate
Lithuanian Christian Democratic Party politicians
Prime Ministers of Lithuania
Speakers of the Seimas
Ministers of Justice of Lithuania
Lithuanian schoolteachers
Lithuanian judges
Saint Petersburg State University alumni
20th-century Lithuanian lawyers
20th-century Lithuanian educators